"Mi Amor Soy Yo" is an electropop song about self-acceptance co-written by Zemmoa, Tessa Ía (Camila Sodi's sister), and the high-energy duet Trans-X, and produced by Juan Soto. The song samples "El Cóndor Pasa".

Music video 
The video shows Zemmoa and Tessa Ía having at sleepover or slumber party at her parents house in Cuernavaca.

Reception 
The song went viral on Spotify surpassing one million plays in its first year.

References 

2021 singles
2021 songs
Spanish-language songs